John Fletcher (27 October 1893 – August 1968) was an Australian cricketer. He played in one first-class match for Queensland in 1919/20.

See also
 List of Queensland first-class cricketers

References

External links
 

1893 births
1968 deaths
Australian cricketers
Queensland cricketers
Cricketers from Brisbane